Theodore Raymond Knight (born March 26, 1973) is an American actor. He is best known for his role as Dr. George O'Malley on the ABC medical drama television series Grey's Anatomy (2005–2009, 2020), which earned him a nomination for the Primetime Emmy Award for Outstanding Supporting Actor in a Drama Series in 2007.

Early life
Knight was born in Minneapolis, Minnesota, where he became involved with the Guthrie Theater at the age of twelve. He attended Annunciation Catholic School in Minneapolis, for grades K-8. Knight received the Conners Foundation Scholarship as a freshman and apprenticed at the Children's Theatre Company. He also worked at the local Red Owl supermarket alongside his brother. After finishing high school at the Academy of Holy Angels in Richfield, Knight enrolled at the University of St. Thomas for a brief period of time. He dropped out and soon landed leading roles at the Guthrie Theater.

Career
Knight moved to New York City and appeared on the stage. He played opposite Patti LuPone in the 2001 Broadway revival of Noises Off. He performed in 2003 as Damis in Tartuffe. He performed in the 2003 Off-Broadway production of Scattergood, receiving a Drama Desk Award nomination as Outstanding Featured Actor in a Play. Knight also starred Off-Broadway at Primary Stages in the 2004 drama Boy.

On television, Knight was a regular cast member of the short-lived Nathan Lane/Laurie Metcalf 2003 CBS television series Charlie Lawrence.

In 2005, Knight was cast in his breakthrough role as Dr. George O'Malley on the ABC medical drama Grey's Anatomy. Introduced as a surgical intern at the fictional Seattle Grace Hospital, O'Malley worked his way up to resident level, while his relationships with his colleagues Meredith Grey (Ellen Pompeo), Cristina Yang (Sandra Oh), Izzie Stevens (Katherine Heigl) and Alex Karev (Justin Chambers) formed a focal point of the series. When Knight auditioned for the show, he expected a one-season run. In 2009, after the conclusion of the fifth season, it was confirmed that Knight would not be returning for the show's sixth season. The actor said the reason for his departure was due to a "breakdown in communication" with executive producer Shonda Rhimes, his character's lack of screen time, and his decision to come out as gay.

Knight received generally positive reviews for his performance as O'Malley, and garnered a nomination for Outstanding Supporting Actor in a Drama Series at the 59th Primetime Emmy Awards.

Knight starred as Leo Frank in a production of the musical Parade, which opened October 4, 2009, at the Mark Taper Forum in Los Angeles. He returned to Broadway in David Mamet's A Life in the Theatre in 2010, where he played the role of John, opposite Patrick Stewart. In 2019, he voiced Sir Cedric, the gay protagonist in the animated series The Bravest Knight.
In 2016 a sci-fi series called 11.22.63 with James Franco aired one season. Knight plays Johnny Clayton, Franco’s love interest’s abusive husband.

Personal life
Knight is gay. On October 5, 2013, Knight married Patrick B. Leahy, a ballet dancer and writer, in Hudson, New York. They had been living together for six years.

Filmography

Film

Television

Stage
Broadway

Source: Playbill Vault

 Noises Off (2001 revival) as Tim Allgood
 Tartuffe (2003 revival) as Damis
 A Life in the Theatre (2010) as John
 It's Only a Play (2015) as Frank Finger

Off-Broadway

Source: Internet Off-Broadway Database

 Marvin's Room (1998) 
 This Lime Tree Bower (1999) as Joe
 Macbeth (1999) as Donalbain/Messenger
 "The Refreshment of the Spirit" (2000) 
 Right Way to Sue (2001 at HERE Mainstage) as Franklin/Various characters
 The Hologram Theory (2000) at MCGinn/Cazale Theater as Tweety
 The Lake's End (2003)
 Scattergood (2003) as Brendan Hilliard
 Voices of Peace and Dissent (2003) at Worth Street Theatre
 Boy (2004) as title character
 The Marriage of Bette & Boo (2007)
 Sold   (2011)  as Michael
  Romeo and Juliet (2013) as Mercutio
 Pocatello (2014) (Playwrights Horizons)

Readings

 Truth or Consequences (Staged Reading)
 The Fool (2002) (Staged Reading)
 White People (Staged Reading)
 The Scholar (Staged Reading)
 Lend Me A Tenor (2009) (Staged Reading)
 On a Clear Day (2010) (Staged Reading)
 Torch Song Trilogy (2011) (Staged Reading)
 June Moon (2011) (Roundabout PlayReading Series)
 Honeymoon in Vegas (2011) (Staged Reading) as Jack Singer
  The Miser (2012) (Reading)

Regional

 What Didn't Happen (2000) (Workshop at Vassar)
 Earth to Bucky (2003) at Bay Street Theater as Bucky
 Parade (musical) (2009) as Leo Frank at Mark Taper Forum – Los Angeles, CA
The Seagull (2012) (radio theater) as Konstantin Gavrilovich Treplev, James Bridges Theater at UCLA – Los Angeles, CA

Guthrie Theater – Minneapolis, MN

 A Christmas Carol (1978–1980, 1996) as Tiny Tim, Dick Wilkins/Others
 Philadelphia, Here I Come! (1996) as Joe
 She Stoops to Conquer (1996)
 Racing Demon as Ewan Gilmour (1997)
 A Midsummer Night's Dream (1997) as Francis Flute
 Much Ado About Nothing (1998) as Watchman
 Ah, Wilderness! (1999) as Richard Miller
 Amadeus (2001) as Wolfgang Amadeus Mozart

Jungle Theater – Minneapolis, MN

 Journey's End as 2nd Lt. Jimmy Raleigh (1995)

Minnesota History Theatre – St. Paul, MN

 Civil Ceremony as Samuel (1996)

Illusion Theatre – Minneapolis, MN

 Angelheaded Hipster: Howl for Allen (1997) as Allen Ginsberg

Women's Club of Minneapolis – Minneapolis, MN

 The Laramie Project (2008)

Chanhassen Dinner Theatres – Chanhassen, MN

 Brighton Beach Memoirs (1993) as Eugene Morris Jerome

Theatre in the Round – Minneapolis, MN

 Gemini (1992) as Randy

Off-Broadway Musical Theatre – New Hope, MN

 Oliver! (1985) as Oliver

References

External links

 
 T. R. Knight on TVguide.com
 T. R. Knight at Broadway.com
 ABC Bio

Articles
 2001 interview at Broadway.com
 2004 article from Playbill
 2006 interview at ABC News
 2006 article from Minneapolis Star Tribune

1973 births
Living people
20th-century American male actors
21st-century American male actors
American male stage actors
American male television actors
American gay actors
LGBT people from Minnesota
Male actors from Minneapolis
American people of German descent